Hannibal is a village in Oswego County, New York, United States. The population was 555 at the 2010 census. The village is named after Hannibal, the hero of ancient Carthage.

The Village of Hannibal is located in the western part of the Town of Hannibal on New York State Routes 3 and 104, and Oswego County Route 34.

History 
The first settlement came circa 1808 with a structure made of logs on the site of a former Indian encampment. The village was incorporated in 1860. The population was then 416. By 1895, the population had reached 450.

Geography
Hannibal is located at  (43.320945, -76.576193). The village is located on Nine Mile Creek.

According to the United States Census Bureau, the village has a total area of 1.1 square miles (3.0 km2), all land.

Demographics

At the 2000 census, there were 542 people, 213 households and 138 families residing in the village. The population density was 476.5 per square mile (183.6/km2). There were 235 housing units at an average density of 206.6 per square mile (79.6/km2). The racial makeup of the village was 98.89% White, 0.55% Black or African American, 0.37% Native American, and 0.18% from two or more races. Hispanic or Latino of any race were 0.55% of the population.

There were 213 households, of which 33.3% had children under the age of 18 living with them, 48.8% were married couples living together, 11.7% had a female householder with no husband present and 35.2% were non-families. 26.8% of all households were made up of individuals, and 14.1% had someone living alone who was 65 years of age or older. The average household size was 2.54 and the average family size was 3.16.

26.4% of the population were  under the age of 18, 8.1% from 18 to 24, 27.1% from 25 to 44, 26.8% from 45 to 64, and 11.6% who were 65 years of age or older. The median age was 37 years. For every 100 females, there were 88.9 males. For every 100 females age 18 and over, there were 89.1 males.

The median household income was $33,333 and the median family income was $50,556. Males had a median income of $32,292 and females $20,875. The per capita income was $16,345. About 6.6% of families and 13.0% of the population were below the poverty line, including 12.9% of those under age 18 and 20.9% of those age 65 or over.

Education 
Public K-12 education is provided by the Hannibal Central School District.

References

External links
 Early history of Hannibal region
 Hannibal Central School Homepage
 RW&O Railroad Station, Hannibal, NY

Villages in New York (state)
Syracuse metropolitan area
Villages in Oswego County, New York